Banco Itaú Chile was one of the largest Chilean banks and a subsidiary of Brazilian bank Itaú Unibanco, was  founded in 2006,  as Bank Boston in Chile. Itaú Unibanco boughtin 2006 the Bank Boston's operation and changed its brand to Itaú. In September 2011 Banco Itaú Chile announced the purchase of operations of British bank HSBC in Chile. It has 92 bank branches, 70 ATM's and more than 2.400 employees and about 150.000 customers. In 2014 the bank merged with Corpbanca, forming Itaú Corpbanca.

External links
 Official Website

References

Banks of Chile
Itaúsa
Itaú Unibanco
Banks established in 2006
2006 establishments in Chile
Banks disestablished in 2014
2014 disestablishments in Chile
Defunct banks of Chile